Julietta Vardanyan is an Armenian pianist, harpsichordist, and organist.

Biography
Vardanyan was born in Yerevan. She graduated from the Yerevan State Conservatory (Professor Vagharshak Harutyunyan). She has had master classes by pianists Paul Badura-Skoda and Boris Berman (Obidos, Portugal).

As a soloist performed with  Narekatsi, "Four Seasons" (Moscow), the Moldova's National Chamber Orchestras, Armenia State Youth, Opera and Ballet National and Zaporozhye (Ukraine) Symphonic Orchestras, conductors V. Bulakhov (Russia), C. Florea (Romania), A. Khaindrava (Georgia/Czech Republic), Sergey Smbatyan R. Asatryan, A. Talalyan, M. Kokzhayev, Y. Yakulov. She is the first performer of the piano concertos of Composer Yakov Yakulov (USA) and Hayg Boyadjian.

Since 2013 she is the executive director of "Talalyan Brothers" festival.

Since 2009 she has formed a piano-cello duo "Ars lunga".

At present "Ars Lunga" makes "Anthology of Armenian Chamber Music" recordings part 2, which summarizes Armenian piano trios (compositions for piano, violin and cello).

See also
 Ars lunga

References

External links
 Interview with Julietta Vardanyan

1983 births
Living people
Musicians from Yerevan
Armenian harpsichordists
Armenian pianists
Armenian women pianists
Armenian organists
Women organists
21st-century pianists
21st-century organists
21st-century Armenian musicians
21st-century classical musicians
Women harpsichordists
21st-century women pianists